Big Wreck are a Canadian-American rock band formed by Ian Thornley and  Brian Doherty in Boston, Massachusetts in 1992. The band was rounded out with David Henning and Forrest Williams.  They disbanded in 2002 and Ian Thornley pursued a solo career with his own band Thornley.  In 2010, Ian Thornley and Brian Doherty reunited for a cross-Canada tour, playing both Big Wreck and Thornley songs. In 2012, under the name Big Wreck, the band released their third studio album, Albatross. The band has since released the albums Ghosts in 2014, Grace Street in 2017, ...But For the Sun in 2019, and are currently releasing three EPs that will be put together to make their seventh full-length album 7. It is to be fully released on March 24, 2023.

History

Formation, band name, In Loving Memory Of...
Big Wreck was originally formed in Boston, Massachusetts by guitarist Ian Thornley, guitarist Brian Doherty, bassist Dave Henning and drummer Forest Williams while they were students at the Berklee College of Music. Henning and Doherty were previously part of the band Divine Right with lead singer Jim McDermott and drummer Dave Tuohy. The future Big Wreck lineup began jamming and playing gigs together under the name Still Waters in 1992. Unsatisfied with their name, they set out to choose a new official band name, and according to Thornley they settled upon the name Big Wreck in 1994 after something went wrong during a rehearsal session and Doherty exclaimed the session was a “big wreck”. In early 1995, the band recorded and released their first known demo tape which featured six songs, one of which was the original recording of "Overemphasizing" which would be later remixed and remastered for their debut album. The other five songs have yet to see a commercial release. Upon their formation, Thornley was not the original singer of the band, but he became the singer after the band couldn't find one. After a few years of gigging in the Boston area and Toronto, the band got signed to Atlantic Records and released their debut album In Loving Memory Of... in 1997. In the US, their single "The Oaf (My Luck Is Wasted)" reached the top ten on the Billboard Mainstream Rock Chart in early 1998. Four months later, their follow-up single "That Song" reached the top 40 on that same chart. The band found even bigger commercial success in Canada, scoring 4 top 40 hits on the Canadian Singles Chart.  The band went on a 17-date tour to publicize their releases.

The Pleasure and the Greed, breakup, other projects
Big Wreck released their second album, The Pleasure and the Greed, in June 2001. Three singles were released, all of which failed to chart in the U.S.

In October of that year, the band played a special show at Toronto's Roy Thomson Hall accompanied by the Toronto Symphony Orchestra and the Uzume Taiko Ensemble of drummers, guitarist Eric Johnson and The Tragically Hip's Paul Langlois and Robby Baker.

The band broke up in early 2003. Ian Thornley moved back to Toronto and formed the band Thornley. Brian Doherty moved to Camlachie, a small community near Sarnia, Ontario, where he taught guitar and prepared students for University or Conservatory entrance requirements. Doherty also went on to form the indie rock band Death of 8.

Reunion, Albatross, and Bag of Tricks 
In 2010, Doherty filled in as guitarist at a Thornley show during the Tiny Pictures tour, and that led to Doherty joining the band as a touring member. Later that year, a new tour promoted as "An Evening with Thornley and Big Wreck" followed, and as a result of the tour's success, the band assumed the Big Wreck moniker, including the existing members of Thornley in the new Big Wreck. In secret, Big Wreck had worked on reunion album which would later be announced as Albatross. After recording the album, signing to Anthem, and departing from 604 Records in July 2011, drummer Christopher Henry left the group and was replaced with touring drummer Brad Park. In November 2011, Big Wreck released the lead single and title track off their upcoming album, "Albatross" their first single release in over ten years. The song received praise and chart success in both the US and Canada, eventually earning the band's first #1 hit.

On February 5, 2012, Big Wreck performed at the Sound Academy in Toronto for Canada's Official Super Bowl XLVI party. They also completed two tours that year, touring Canada from British Columbia to Ontario from April to July, then accompanying Theory of a Deadman for their Jingle Bell Rock tour from November to December, at which time Brad Park was replaced with Chuck Keeping on drums. On June 25, 2013, the band released their first EP, Bag of Tricks, which was compiled of live recordings from the Albatross Tour and a cover of The Cars' "Good Times Roll." It was released as a digital exclusive.

Ghosts and Grace Street
In 2014, the band released their fourth studio album, Ghosts. The album was released in Canada on June 10, 2014 and in the US in July. The album reached #5 on the Canadian Albums Chart and #4 on the US Billboard Heatseekers Albums Chart. The album was nominated for "Rock Album of the Year" at the Juno Awards of 2015.

In November 2016, Big Wreck released a new single "One Good Piece Of Me" from their upcoming album, Grace Street.

On January 5, 2017, after the recording of Grace Street, but prior to its release, guitarist Paulo Neta departed from Big Wreck. Ian Thornley wrote the following on Big Wreck's Facebook page:

Grace Street was released on February 3, 2017. The band embarked on a 31-date tour in support of the album, with supporting act Ascot Royals.

20th Anniversary tour, Brian Doherty's death, ...But For the Sun
In 2018, Big Wreck embarked on a 35-date North American tour to celebrate the 20th anniversary of In Loving Memory Of..., in which they performed every song from the album at each show. Attica Riots were the supporting act for the tour. The album was also physically reissued the same year featuring new artwork and two previously unreleased outtakes from the recording sessions, plus the album's first ever vinyl press.

On February 22, 2019, Big Wreck released a new single, "Locomotive", from their upcoming album, ...But For the Sun. In a promotional interview soon after, Ian Thornley revealed the titles of several other upcoming songs from the album, including "Follow Me," "Give Us a Smile," and "Found My Place." On May 10, 2019, the band released a follow-up single, entitled "Too Far Gone."

Brian Doherty (born on April 2, 1968) died of lung cancer on June 5, 2019, at age 51. The band performed their previously scheduled shows as a trio, with Chris Caddell joining the band later that year. On July 22, 2019, the band released a third single entitled "One More Chance," along with a release date and a tracklist of ...But For the Sun. The album was released on August 30, 2019. The band embarked on a 49-date tour in support of the record, with Texas King as the supporting act.

Big Wreck 7
In early 2021, Big Wreck announced that they had been working on new music for a follow-up to ...But For the Sun. They had recorded 15 songs for a new album, but had discussed releasing them in increments as opposed to the conventional full-length album format. This was due to Ian Thornley's belief in how music is consumed differently nowadays, and felt like fans would be able to take in the large amount of new material more easily by releasing a handful of songs at a time. It was also announced around this time that long-time drummer Chuck Keeping had left the group amicably to focus on family, and former Thornley drummer Sekou Lumumba had joined the band as their new drummer.

In the summer of 2021, the band released two one-off singles with the help of Chad Kroeger of Nickelback entitled "Middle Of Nowhere" and "Ought To Be," the first of which became their highest charting single in Canada since "Albatross," peaking at #4. These songs were seen as a slight departure of style from the music the band usually releases, due to the more pop-influenced nature of the songs, similar to that of the Thornley albums from the 2000s. They would also be the final songs the band recorded with Chuck Keeping. The band also released their Bag of Tricks EP on limited edition coloured vinyl for Record Store Day.

On October 7, 2021, Big Wreck announced the upcoming release of 7.1, the first of three EPs (the latter consequently titled 7.2 and 7.3) that will be released individually and eventually put together to make the band's seventh full-length album. The lead single from the project "Bombs Away," was released the same day. A second single "Fields" (featuring Daniel Greaves of The Watchmen, and Ian D'Sa of Billy Talent on backing vocals) was released on November 12, 2021. 7.1 was released on November 19, 2021, and the band announced a 15-date tour of Canada. The first half of the tour was postponed to Spring 2022 due to the ongoing COVID-19 pandemic. BRKN LOVE and Monster Truck were the supporting acts for the tour. The band released a cover of Sting's "Russians" to their Bandcamp website on March 4, 2022, in response to the ongoing Russo-Ukrainian War. All proceeds from the release were donated to the UNHRC. On May 6, 2022, the band released the third single of the project, entitled "Spit It Out," to Canadian radio stations. On June 1, 2022, the band announced the release 7.2 along with a campaign that allows people to pre-order the EP in several different formats, one of which featuring a bonus track. Each pre-order will allow people to enter a draw to win a turntable and with a one-off pressing of the EP. The same day, a fourth single "Better Off," was made available on streaming services. 7.2 was released on June 17, 2022. On September 30, 2022, the fifth single "Fear & Cowardice" was released to radio with a music video featuring live footage from an exclusive show at The Horseshoe Tavern that took place on July 21, 2022, Ian Thornley's 50th birthday. On November 24, 2022, bassist Dave McMillan hosted an exclusive livestream and confirmed that 7.3 would be released on March 24, 2023. On March 10, 2023, 7.3 was made available for digital pre-order and pre-save along with the sixth single of the project "Melody & Sound." 7.3 (and consequently, 7) was released on March 24, 2023.

Members

Current
Ian Thornley – lead vocals, lead guitar, keyboards (1992–2003, 2010–present)
Dave McMillan – bass guitar, backing vocals (2010–present)
Chris Caddell - rhythm guitar, backing vocals (2019–present)
Sekou Lumumba – drums (2021–present)

Former
Brian Doherty – rhythm guitar, mandolin, banjo, backing vocals (1992–2003, 2010–2019; his death)
Dave Henning – bass guitar, backing vocals (1992–2003)
Forrest Williams - drums (1992-2003)
Paulo Neta – lead guitar, rhythm guitar, backing vocals (2010–2017)
Christopher Henry - drums (2010-2011)
Brad Park – drums (2011–2014)
Chuck Keeping – drums (2014–2021)

Timeline

Tours

In Loving Memory Of Tour (1997-1999)
The Pleasure And the Greed Tour (2001-2002) 
An Evening With Ian Thornley and Big Wreck (2010)
Albatross Tour (2012-2013)
Ghosts Tour (2014)
Summer Tour 2016 
Grace Street Tour (2017)
In Loving Memory Of...20th Anniversary Tour (2018)
Summer Tour 2018 
But For the Sun Tour (2019)
Big Wreck 7 Tour (2021-2023)

Discography

Studio albums

Demos & Extended plays
Big Wreck - Demo (1995)
Bag of Tricks - Live EP (2013)
7.1 - EP (2021)
7.2 - EP (2022)
7.3 - EP (2023)

Singles

Music videos

See also
Thornley
Canadian rock

References

External links
 Big Wreck - The Official Website
 
 

Berklee College of Music alumni
Rock music groups from Massachusetts
Musical groups from Boston
Musical groups established in 1994
Musical groups disestablished in 2002
Musical groups reestablished in 2010
1994 establishments in Massachusetts
Canadian alternative rock groups
American alternative rock groups
Canadian hard rock musical groups
Musical groups from Toronto